The Women's World Chess Championship (WWCC) is played to determine the world champion in women's chess. Like the World Chess Championship, it is administered by FIDE.

Unlike with most sports recognized by the International Olympic Committee, where competition is either "mixed" (containing everyone) or split into men and women, in chess women are both allowed to compete in the "open" division (including the World Chess Championship) yet also have a separate Women's Championship (only open to women).

History

Era of Menchik
The Women's World Championship was established by FIDE in 1927 as a single tournament held alongside the Chess Olympiad. The winner of that tournament, Vera Menchik, did not have any special rights as the men's champion did—instead she had to defend her title by playing as many games as all the challengers. She did this successfully in every other championship in her lifetime (1930, 1931, 1933, 1935, 1937 and 1939).

Dominance of the Soviet Union players (1950–1991)

Menchik died, still champion, in 1944 in a German air raid on Kent. The next championship was another round-robin tournament in 1949–50 and was won by Lyudmila Rudenko. Thereafter a system similar to that of the overall championship was established, with a cycle of Candidates events (and later Interzonals) to pick a challenger to face the reigning champion.

The first such Candidates tournament was held in Moscow, 1952.  Elisaveta Bykova won and proceeded to defeat Rudenko with seven wins, five losses, and two draws to become the third champion. The next Candidates tournament was won by Olga Rubtsova.  Instead of directly playing Bykova, however, FIDE decided that the championship should be held between the three top players in the world.  Rubtsova won at Moscow in 1956, one-half point ahead of Bykova, who finished five points ahead of Rudenko.  Bykova regained the title in 1958 and defended it against Kira Zvorykina, winner of a Candidates tournament, in 1959.

The fourth Candidates tournament was held in 1961 in Vrnjacka Banja, and was utterly dominated by Nona Gaprindashvili of Georgia, who won with ten wins, zero losses, and six draws.  She then decisively defeated Bykova with seven wins, no losses, and four draws in Moscow, 1962 to become champion.  Gaprindashvili defended her title against Alla Kushnir of Russia at Riga 1965 and Tbilisi/Moscow 1969.  In 1972, FIDE introduced the same system for the women's championship as with the overall championship: a series of Interzonal tournaments, followed by the Candidates matches.  Kushnir won again, only to be defeated by Gaprindashvili at Riga 1972. Gaprindashvili defended the title one last time against Nana Alexandria of Georgia at Pitsunda/Tbilisi 1975.

In 1976–1978 Candidates cycle, 17-year-old Maya Chiburdanidze of Georgia ended up the surprise star, defeating Nana Alexandria, Elena Akhmilovskaya, and Alla Kushnir to face Gaprindashvili in the 1978 finals at Tbilisi.  Chiburdanidze soundly defeated Gaprindashvili, marking the end of one Georgian's domination and the beginning of another's.  Chiburdanidze defended her title against Alexandria at Borjomi/Tbilisi 1981 and Irina Levitina at Volgograd 1984.  Following this, FIDE reintroduced the Candidates tournament system.  Akhmilovskaya, who had earlier lost to Chiburdanidze in the Candidates matches, won the tournament was but was still defeated by Chiburdanidze at Sofia 1986.  Chiburdanidze's final title defense came against Nana Ioseliani at Telavi 1988.

Post-Soviet era (1991–2010)
Chiburdanidze's domination ended in Manila 1991, where the young Chinese star Xie Jun defeated her, after finishing second to the still-active Gaprindashvili in an Interzonal, tying with Alisa Marić in the Candidates tournament, and then beating Maric in a tie-breaker match.

It was during this time that the three Polgar sisters Susan (also known as Zsuzsa), Sofia (Zsófia), and Judit emerged as dominant players. However they tended to compete in open tournaments, avoiding the women's championship.

Susan Polgar eventually changed her policy. She won the 1992 Candidates tournament in Shanghai. The Candidates final—an eight-game match between the top two finishers in the tournament—was a drawn match between Polgar and Ioseliani, even after two tiebreaks. The match was decided by a lottery, which Ioseliani won. She was then promptly crushed by Xie Jun (8½–2½) in the championship at Monaco 1993.

The next cycle was dominated by Polgar. She tied with Chiburdanidze in the Candidates tournament, defeated her easily in the match (5½–1½), and then decisively defeated Xie Jun (8½–4½) in Jaén 1996 for the championship.

In 1997, Russian Alisa Galliamova and Chinese Xie Jun finished first and second, but Galliamova refused to play the final match entirely in China. FIDE eventually awarded the match to Xie Jun by default.

However, by the time all these delays were sorted out, Polgar had given birth to her first child. She requested that the match be postponed. FIDE refused, and eventually set up the championship to be between Galliamova and Xie Jun. The championship was held in Kazan, Tatarstan and Shenyang, China, and Xie Jun won with five wins, three losses, and seven draws.

In 2000 a knock-out event, similar to the FIDE overall title and held alongside it, was the new format of the women's world championship. It was won by Xie Jun. In 2001 a similar event determined the champion, Zhu Chen. Another knock-out, this one held separately from the overall championship, in Elista, the capital of the Russian republic of Kalmykia (of which FIDE President Kirsan Ilyumzhinov is president), from May 21 to June 8, 2004, produced Bulgarian Antoaneta Stefanova as champion. As with Polgar five years prior, Zhu Chen did not participate due to pregnancy.

In 2006 the title returned to China. The new champion Xu Yuhua was pregnant during the championship.

In 2008, the title went to Russian grandmaster Alexandra Kosteniuk, who, in the final, beat Chinese prodigy Hou Yifan 2½–1½, then aged 14 (see Women's World Chess Championship 2008).

In 2010 the title returned to China once again. Hou Yifan, the runner-up in the previous championship, became the youngest ever women's world champion at the age of 16. She beat her compatriot WGM Ruan Lufei 2–2 (classic) 3–1 (rapid playoffs).

Yearly tournaments (2010–2018) 

Beginning from 2010, the Women's World Chess Championship would be held annually in alternating formats. In even years a 64-player knockout system would be used, in the odd years a classical match featuring only two players would be held. The 2011 edition was between the 2010 champion Hou Yifan and the winner of the FIDE Women's Grand Prix 2009–2011. Since Hou Yifan won the Grand Prix, her challenger was the runner-up, Koneru Humpy.

In 2011 Hou Yifan successfully defended her women's world champion title in the Women's World Chess Championship 2011 in Tirana, Albania against Koneru Humpy. Hou won three games and drew five in the ten-game match, winning the title with two games to spare.

Hou Yifan was knocked-out in the second round in Women's World Chess Championship 2012, which was played in Khanty Mansiysk. Anna Ushenina, seeded 30th in the tournament, won the final against Antoaneta Stefanova 3½–2½.

The Women's World Chess Championship 2013 was a match over 10 games between defending champion Anna Ushenina and Hou Yifan who had won the FIDE Women's Grand Prix 2011–2012. After seven of ten games Hou Yifan won the match 5.5 to 1.5 to retake the title.

After Hou declined to defend her title at the Women's World Chess Championship 2015, the title was won by Mariya Muzychuk, who defeated Natalia Pogonina in the final.

Hou defeated Muzychuk 6–3 to reclaim the Women's World Chess Championship 2016 title for her 4th championship in March 2016.

The following year Tan Zhongyi defeated Anna Muzychuk for the title at the Women's World Chess Championship 2017.

Tan lost the title defending it against Ju Wenjun (with Hou not participating at this event) at the Women's World Chess Championship Match 2018.

Return to match-only format 
Due to various hosting and timing issues, the championships had varied from their intended annual calendar in recent years. FIDE held a second world championship in 2018 in order to get back on schedule.

After the 2018 championship tournament the new FIDE president Arkady Dvorkovich announced the format would be changed back to matches only. He said the many different champions the yearly system created discredited the championship title as a whole. Aleksandra Goryachkina won the Candidates tournament, held in June 2019, to challenge for the World Championship.  Ju Wenjun retained her title in the 2020 Championship.

Women's World Chess Champions

List of Women's World Chess Championships

Most wins
 Vera Menchik – 9 titles
 Nona Gaprindashvili – 5 titles
 Maia Chiburdanidze – 5 titles
 Xie Jun – 4 titles
 Hou Yifan – 4 titles
 Ju Wenjun – 3 titles
 Elisaveta Bykova – 3 titles

See also
 Development of the Women's World Chess Championship
 World Chess Championship
 Women's World Team Chess Championship 2009
 List of female chess players

References

External links
WCC for Women (Interzonal, Candidates, World Championship)
A history of women's world chess champions
Chessbase report on 2006 championship

 
Women's chess competitions
Chess
Women
Recurring sporting events established in 1927